Otto Nathan (1893–1987) was an economist who taught at Princeton University (1933–35), New York University (1935–42), Vassar College (1942–44), and Howard University (1946-52).

Nathan was a close friend of Albert Einstein for many years and was designated by Einstein as co-trustee of his literary estate with Helen Dukas.

Publications
Otto Nathan was the author of the following books:
 Nazi War Finance and Banking Our Economy in War. Cambridge, Massachusetts: National Bureau of Economic Research, 1944. Paperback: 
 The Nazi Economic System: Germany's Mobilization for War. New York: Russell & Russell, 1971. Hardcover textbook: , 
 Einstein on Peace. Albert Einstein; Otto Nathan and Heinz Norden, editors and translators. Preface by Bertrand Russell. Editions:
 1960. New York: Simon & Schuster
 1968. New York: Schocken Books. Paperback: 
 1975. New York: Schocken Books. Hardcover: 
 1981. New York and Avenel, New Jersey: Avenel Publishing. Hardcover:

References
 Vassar College Encyclopedia entry, The Friendship of Albert Einstein and Otto Nathan.

1893 births
1987 deaths
American people of German-Jewish descent
20th-century American economists
New York University faculty
Princeton University faculty
Vassar College faculty
Howard University faculty